T65 may refer to:
 7.62×51mm NATO, bullet type
 T65 telephone
 T65 assault rifle
 T65 flour, french flour grade